Flood forecasting is the use of forecasted precipitation and streamflow data in rainfall-runoff and streamflow routing models to forecast flow rates and water levels for periods ranging from a few hours to days ahead, depending on the size of the watershed or river basin. Flood forecasting can also make use of forecasts of precipitation in an attempt to extend the lead-time available. 

Flood forecasting is an important component of flood warning, where the distinction between the two is that the outcome of flood forecasting is a set of forecast time-profiles of channel flows or river levels at various locations, while "flood warning" is the task of making use of these forecasts to tell decisions on warnings of floods.

Real-time flood forecasting at regional area can be done within seconds by using the technology of artificial neural network. Effective real-time flood forecasting models could be useful for early warning and disaster prevention.

AI can assist us in predicting floods. A case study of the Red River of the north applied Deep Learning algorithms to predict flood-water-level using previous data from Pembina, Drayton, and Grand Forks.

See also
 Runoff model (reservoir)
 Flood alert
 Flood Modeller Pro

References

External links
 Application of self-organising maps and multi-layer perceptron-artificial neural networks for streamflow and water level forecasting in data-poor catchments: the case of the Lower Shire floodplain, Malawi
 Delft-FEWS, state of the art system for flood forecasting and operational water management (most advanced system available, used on national scale in Europe and the USA)
 RainOff, a conceptual rainfall-runoff model using a nonlinear reservoir
 hepex.org the Hydrologic Ensemble Prediction EXperiment, an informal yet highly active group of researchers in the field of predictive hydrologic uncertainty.

Hydrology